Assini may refer to:
Mark Assini, a syndicated columnist and former public official from New York
Assinie, a resort town in Côte d'Ivoire